Australian Gas Networks Limited, formerly Envestra Limited, is an Australian energy company that operates natural gas transmission pipelines and distribution networks in South Australia, Victoria, Queensland, New South Wales, and the Northern Territory. The company owns distribution systems in a number of towns and metropolitan areas including Adelaide, Brisbane, Melbourne, Rockhampton, Albury, Alice Springs, Bundaberg and Whyalla. It outsources the operation and management of the assets to the APA Group.

In October 1993, Boral acquired from the South Australian government SAGASCO, its vertically integrated natural gas monopoly. Boral combined SAGASCO's distribution network with businesses it owned in Queensland to form Envestra, which was floated in early 1997. In March 1999, Envestra acquired part of the former Gas and Fuel Corporation's distribution network in Victoria, known as the Stratus distribution network, and renamed it Envestra (Vic).

In 2013, APA Group announced an approach to the board of Envestra with an all-share merger proposal. In September 2014, Hong Kong-based Cheung Kong Group bought all the shares in Envestra, including APA's 33.4% stake, while APA retained the operation and management of Envestra's assets until 2027. In October 2014, the company's name was changed to Australian Gas Networks Limited.

References

External links

 

Companies formerly listed on the Australian Securities Exchange
Natural gas companies of Australia
CK Hutchison Holdings